Jeong Mi-ja (born 8 March 1970) is a South Korean long-distance runner. She competed in the women's 10,000 metres at the 1988 Summer Olympics.

References

1970 births
Living people
Athletes (track and field) at the 1988 Summer Olympics
South Korean female long-distance runners
Olympic athletes of South Korea
Place of birth missing (living people)